The 11th Independent Battery Indiana Light Artillery, generally known as the 11th Indiana Battery, was an artillery battery in the Union Army during the American Civil War. It served in several important campaigns in the Western Theater, including the Battle of Chickamauga in late 1863.

Recruited at Fort Wayne, Indiana, in late 1861, the 11th Indiana Battery was mustered into service on December 17, 1861, at Indianapolis, Indiana. It was ordered to report for duty in Louisville, Kentucky, on February 6, 1862. The battery was consolidated with the 18th Indiana Battery on November 21, 1864.

See also

 List of Indiana Civil War regiments

References

External links
11th Indiana Battery Light Artillery Homepage

11
Military units and formations established in 1861
1861 establishments in Indiana
Artillery units and formations of the American Civil War
Military units and formations disestablished in 1864
1864 disestablishments in the United States